McMillan is an unincorporated community in San Saba County, in the U.S. state of Texas. According to the Handbook of Texas, the community had a population of 15 in 2000.

History
McMillan was named for Texas Ranger Captain Newton D. McMillin in the late 1850s. E.B. House petitioned for a post office to be established here on October 6, 1904, but it opened in Bomar. G.B. Meeks sold his store to local settler Hugh Miller that same year. Only a cemetery remained in 1979 and had a population of 15 in 2000.

Geography

Education
Flat Rock School was built in McMillan in 1882. Another one was built on Hugh Miller's property in 1899. Another one was built around 1923 and joined the San Saba Independent School District in 1933.

References

Unincorporated communities in San Saba County, Texas
Unincorporated communities in Texas